Keith Smith is a Canadian retired ice hockey defenseman who was an All-American for Brown.

Career
Despite the NCAA changing their rules to allow for four years of varsity play, Smith spent just three seasons with the Bears, graduating from Brown University in 1974. As a junior he was named to both the All-ECAC and All-American teams. He was regarded highly enough to be selected by the New York Islanders in the NHL Draft. Unfortunately, during his time at Brown, the hockey team was middling at best and missed the conference tournament all three seasons. After graduating, Smith played the tail end of the season with the Fort Worth Wings but decided against pursuing his hockey career and retired.

Career statistics

Regular season and playoffs

Awards and honors

References

External links

1953 births
Living people
Canadian ice hockey defencemen
Ice hockey people from Ontario
Sportspeople from Burlington, Ontario
Brown Bears men's ice hockey players
Chicago Cougars draft picks
New York Islanders draft picks
Fort Worth Wings players
AHCA Division I men's ice hockey All-Americans